Oblong is a village in Crawford County, Illinois, United States. The population was 1,466 at the 2010 census, and then was later recorded to be 1,371 in the 2020 census.

History
Oblong was incorporated in 1883.  The original town site was on a naturally occurring oblongular prairie, hence the name. The crossroads at the town site was the location of a general store owned by Henry Peck.  The prominent sign "Hen. Peck" gave rise to the village's original moniker, Henpeck.

Geography

Demographics
As of the 2020 census there were 1,371 people, 766 households, and 433 families residing in the village. The racial makeup of the village was 95.62% White, 0.66% African American, 0.29% Native American, 0.07% Asian, 0.07% Pacific Islander, 0.22% from other races, and 3.06% from two or more races. Hispanic or Latino of any race were 1.09% of the population.

There were 766 households, out of which 32.11% had children under the age of 18 living with them, 40.60% were married couples living together, 10.84% had a female householder with no husband present, and 43.47% were non-families. 30.81% of all households were made up of individuals, and 12.01% had someone living alone who was 65 years of age or older. The average household size was 2.39 and the average family size was 1.90.

The village's age distribution consisted of 20.8% under the age of 18, 8.0% from 18 to 24, 32.6% from 25 to 44, 19.3% from 45 to 64, and 19.1% who were 65 years of age or older. The median age was 34.9 years. For every 100 females, there were 92.4 males. For every 100 females age 18 and over, there were 81.3 males.

The median income for a household in the village was $47,560, and the median income for a family was $49,279. Males had a median income of $33,208 versus $14,938 for females. The per capita income for the village was $21,621. About 10.2% of families and 20.1% of the population were below the poverty line, including 16.7% of those under age 18 and 12.4% of those age 65 or over.

Arts and culture
It is the home of the Illinois Oil Field Museum and Resource Center, a collection of early oilfield artifacts from the early days of the oil industry in the Illinois Basin and a resource center featuring a collection of early oil field records and resource books.

Education
Oblong has one public four year high school and one public grade school.

References

External links
Oblong Chamber of Commerce

Villages in Crawford County, Illinois
Villages in Illinois
Populated places established in 1883
1883 establishments in Illinois
Sundown towns in Illinois